Swartbroek is a village in the Netherlands, in the municipality of Weert in the province of Limburg.

The village was first mentioned in the 16th century as Swartbroeck, and means "black swampy land".

Swartbroek was home to 276 people in 1840. In 1925, the St Cornelius Church was built. The grist mill De Hoop was built in 1905 using material from a 1788 wind mill. Between 2011 and 2015, it was restored and still in active service.

Gallery

References 

Populated places in Limburg (Netherlands)
Weert